Backwater or Backwaters may refer to:

Music
 Backwaters (album), a 1982 album by American guitarist Tony Rice
 Backwater (band), a jazz fusion band from Mobile, Alabama, or this band's 1976 debut album
 "Backwater", a song by Brian Eno from the album Before and After Science
 "Backwater", a 1974 song by Status Quo from Quo
 "Backwater" (song), a 1994 song recorded by the Meat Puppets
 "Backwaters", 2013 song British band Drenge

Other uses
 Backwaters (management festival), the annual national management festival organized by the Indian Institute of Management, Kozhikode
 Backwater (novel), a novel by Joan Bauer
 Backwater (river), a part of a river in which there is little or no current
 Backwaters Press, an American book publishing company
 Backwater Reservoir, a reservoir in north west Angus, Scotland
 Backcountry, an isolated and under-developed region

See also 
 Kerala backwaters, a chain of brackish lagoons and lakes in India
 Lagoon, a shallow body of water separated from a larger body
 Backwater valve, a device used to protect potable water supplies from backflow
 Blackwater (disambiguation)